The 2014 South American Rhythmic Gymnastics Championships were held in Cúcuta, Colombia, October 15–19, 2014. The competition was organized by the Colombian Gymnastics Federation and approved by the International Gymnastics Federation.

Medalists

References 

2014 in gymnastics
Rhythmic Gymnastics,2014
International gymnastics competitions hosted by Colombia
2014 in Colombian sport